The Seeds of Love is the third studio album by British pop rock band Tears for Fears, released on 25 September 1989 by Fontana Records. It retained the band's epic sound while incorporating influences ranging from jazz and soul to Beatlesque pop. Its lengthy production and scrapped recording sessions cost over £1 million. The album spanned the title hit single "Sowing the Seeds of Love," as well as "Woman in Chains," and "Advice for the Young at Heart", both of which reached the top 40 in several countries.

The Seeds of Love was an international success, entering the UK Albums Chart at number one, and top ten in other countries including the U.S. It has been certified Gold or Platinum in several territories including the United Kingdom, the United States, France, Germany, Canada, and the Netherlands. Despite its success, personal tensions during recording led to band members Curt Smith and Roland Orzabal splitting up at the conclusion of their 1990 world tour, with Orzabal remaining as the band's sole official member until the two reunited in the early 2000s.

In October 2020, the remastered reissue of The Seeds of Love was released in several formats including a super deluxe edition, with B-sides, remixes, and a 5.1 surround sound mix.

Production
The first song composed for The Seeds of Love was "Badman's Song" (originally titled "The Bad Man Song"), written during the band's 1985 world tour after Roland Orzabal overheard two members of the tour personnel maligning him in a hotel room one night. The song was co-written by Orzabal with keyboardist Nicky Holland, who was touring with the band throughout 1985. Holland would go on to play an integral part in the writing and recording of The Seeds of Love, much as keyboardist Ian Stanley had on the band's previous album Songs from the Big Chair.

Recording sessions for the album began in late 1986 with producers Clive Langer and Alan Winstanley, but Orzabal and Curt Smith were unhappy with the results and so the recordings were scrapped in early 1987. Chris Hughes (who had produced both the previous Tears for Fears albums) was then brought back into the fold, but again conflicts arose over the direction of the new material. Orzabal in particular had grown weary of composing and playing music using machines and sequencers, as the majority of Tears for Fears' music had been up to that point, and was striving for something more organic and a different way of working.

The song "Sowing the Seeds of Love" was written in June 1987, the same week as the UK general election in which Margaret Thatcher and the Conservative Party won a third consecutive term in office (reflected in the lyric "Politician granny with your high ideals, have you no idea how the majority feels?"). Hughes and longtime TFF keyboardist Ian Stanley both left the project later in 1987 citing "creative differences", though their contributions to the track remained on the final album. After two failed attempts to make the album, the band opted to produce it themselves, assisted by engineer Dave Bascombe. Also in 1987, Orzabal and Smith flew over to the US to track down a hotel lounge pianist/vocalist named Oleta Adams, whom they had seen playing in Kansas City during their 1985 American tour. Hoping she could add to the organic feel by bringing a soulful warmth to their music, they invited Adams to work with them on their new album. Adams would ultimately perform on three tracks ("Woman in Chains", "Badman's Song" and "Standing on the Corner of the Third World"), and a solo recording contract was also offered to her by the band's record company Fontana.

Recording recommenced in early 1988 and lasted until the summer of 1989. Featuring an assortment of respected session players including drummers Manu Katché and Simon Phillips, bassist Pino Palladino, and a guest appearance by Phil Collins on drums, much of the album was recorded as jam sessions featuring different performances of the music and then edited down later. Some of the tracks, particularly "Badman's Song", were recorded several times in a variety of musical styles including, according to Holland, versions of the song that were reminiscent of Barry White, Little Feat and Steely Dan before settling on the jazz/gospel version that is on the finished album. Co-producer Dave Bascombe commented that the final version of the song was almost nothing like the original demo because it had gone through so many changes. The track "Swords and Knives" was originally written for the 1986 film Sid and Nancy (about the relationship between Sid Vicious and Nancy Spungen), but was rejected by the filmmakers for not being "punk" enough.

Due to the starry cast of session players and lengthy production process, including the scrapped earlier recordings, the album reportedly cost £1 million to make (by comparison, Songs from the Big Chair cost approximately £70,000). The final mix of the album was completed at London's Mayfair Studios in July 1989. Frustrations during the making of the album had also given rise to tensions between Orzabal and Smith, Orzabal having become something of an intricate perfectionist and Smith preoccupied with living a jet set lifestyle rather than focusing on the album (Smith's first marriage had also ended in divorce during the making of the album). At one point, Orzabal considered calling the album Famous Last Words (the title of the album's final track), commenting "it may well turn out to be our last album." Indeed, the duo did not make any further recordings together for over a decade.

Release
Now assigned to the newly reactivated Phonogram subsidiary label Fontana, the first single from the album, "Sowing the Seeds of Love", was released in August 1989. It became a worldwide hit, peaking at no.5 in the UK, no.2 in the US, and no.1 in Canada. The album was released in September 1989, entering the UK Albums Chart at no.1 and would be certified Platinum by the BPI within three weeks. In the US, it peaked at no.8 and was also certified Platinum. This album reached the top ten in numerous other countries around the world.

Two other singles from the album, "Woman in Chains" (recorded as a duet with Adams) and "Advice for the Young at Heart" (the only track featuring Smith on lead vocals) reached the Top 40 in UK and internationally. "Famous Last Words" was released as fourth single in mid-1990 by the record company without the band's involvement, though this only peaked at no.83 in the UK. A video compilation, Sowing the Seeds, featuring the promo videos for the first three singles from the album was also released in 1990.

The band embarked on a world tour to promote the album in 1990, featuring Adams both as a support act and as a player with the band (her solo album, Circle of One, produced by Orzabal and Dave Bascombe was also released during this time). The band's concert at the Santa Barbara County Bowl in May 1990 was filmed and released on home video, titled Going to California.

A 64-page companion book to the album, entitled Tears for Fears – The Seeds of Love, was also released in 1990 by Virgin Books and offers insight into the writing and recording process behind the album as well as the sheet music for each song and rare promotional photographs from the period.

The album was remastered and reissued in 1999 with four bonus tracks which were originally B-sides to the album's first three singles. It does not include the B-side "My Life in the Suicide Ranks" which was an additional B-side to "Woman in Chains" and could at the time only be found on the band's 1996 rarities compilation Saturnine Martial & Lunatic. The Seeds of Love was rereleased again in 2020 in five different formats including a 5-disc super deluxe edition boxed set featuring bonus material such as single versions, B-sides (this time including "My Life in the Suicide Ranks"), demos, outtakes, and a 5.1 surround-sound mix, again made by Steven Wilson, who also was responsible for the surround mix for Songs from the Big Chair. Other editions released at the same time include a 2-CD deluxe edition, a single CD edition, a vinyl album, and a vinyl picture disc album. The deluxe edition peaked at no.13 on the UK Albums Chart in October 2020.

Reception

Lloyd Bradley praised The Seeds of Love in Q, summarising the album as "such a radical departure from Tears for Fears' robust, anthemic pop songs of the early '80s as to make them seem irrelevant." In Rolling Stone, Michael Azerrad wrote, "If with the title track Tears for Fears beg comparison to the Beatles, it's in the unspoken assertion that popular music can also be outstanding music. That's something this remarkable record proves over and over again." Greg Kot of the Chicago Tribune described the album as "astonishing", with a "wide open, soulful spaciousness that belies the heavy production expenses". Los Angeles Times critic Chris Willman enjoyed the first three songs but lamented the "uncharacteristically frenzied rock 'n' roll climaxes" and "underdeveloped and overwrought" lyrics among the later tracks, describing the album as overall "just so-so". Simon Williams, writing for NME, perceived The Seeds of Love as a self-consciously "'adult' and 'mature'" effort and found that Tears for Fears had "tumbled from joyful pop simplicity to cliche-ridden complexity."

In a retrospective review for AllMusic, Stanton Swihart observed the album's "polished, atmospheric soul", labelling it "the apotheosis of Orzabal and Smith's evolution". A review of the 1999 reissue by AllMusic's Bruce Eder pointed towards "the best vocals in Tears for Fears' history" and "their most ambitious production". Appraising the 2020 reissue for Record Collector, John Earls alluded to Orzabal's "obsessive determination to achieve Steely Dan levels of technical perfection", while crediting his "melodic gifts" with preventing the album from "becoming too overblown". On the other hand, Ira Robbins of Trouser Press had praise for the title track and Adams's soulful vocals, but described the bulk of the album as "absurdly overintellectualized" and "almost impenetrable".

30th anniversary reissue 
Following the reissue campaigns of The Hurting (2013) and Songs from the Big Chair (2014), in October 2020, the remastered super deluxe edition of The Seeds of Love was released in several formats, including B-sides, remixes, 22 previously unreleased recordings, and a 5.1 surround sound mix.

Paul Sinclair of the website Super Deluxe Edition co-compiled the track listing, and interviewed band members, producers and collaborators for the extensive sleeve notes of the edition.

Track listing

Note
 A remix of "Johnny Panic and the Bible of Dreams" was also released as a separate single in the UK in 1991 and reached number 70 on the UK Singles Chart and number one on the UK Dance Chart.

2020 Super Deluxe Edition

Personnel 
Tears for Fears
 Roland Orzabal – lead vocals (1-3, 5–8), backing vocals, guitars, keyboards, Fairlight programming 
 Curt Smith – bass guitar, backing vocals, co-lead vocals (3), lead vocals (4)
 Ian Stanley – keyboards and Hammond organ (1, 3, 10)

Additional personnel

 Oleta Adams – keyboards, female vocal (1, 2), acoustic piano (2, 5), backing vocals (5, 12)
 Nicky Holland – keyboards, backing vocals (2, 4, 7), acoustic piano (4, 6, 8), Kurzweil strings (8)
 Simon Clark – keyboards, synthesizers (2, 5), Hammond organ (2, 4, 5, 7)
 Neil Taylor – guitar (1), rhythm guitar (7)
 Robbie McIntosh – lead guitar (2, 7), slide guitar (2)
 Randy Jacobs – guitar
 Pino Palladino – bass (2, 5)
 Phil Collins – drums (1 from 3:32)
 Manu Katché – drums (2, 5)
 Chris Hughes – drums and production (3, 10)
 Simon Phillips – drums (7 from 5:04)
 Luís Jardim – percussion
 Carole Steele – percussion (2, 5)
 Richard Niles – orchestral arrangements (3)
 Jon Hassell – trumpet (5, 8)
 Peter Hope-Evans – harmonica (5)
 Kate St John – saxophone (6), oboe (6)
 Tessa Niles – backing vocals (2, 5, 7), female vocal (6)
 Carol Kenyon – backing vocals (2, 5, 7)
 Maggie Ryder – backing vocals (4)
 Dolette McDonald – backing vocals (7)
 Andy Caine – backing vocals (7)

Production
 Producers – Tears for Fears and David Bascombe
 Engineer – David Bascombe
 Additional engineer – Steve Chase
 Assistant engineers – Heidi Canova and Lee Curle
 Mixing – Bob Clearmountain (tracks 1 and part of 7), David Bascombe (tracks 2–6, part of 7, and 8).
 Mastering – Bob Ludwig
 Art direction and photography – David Scheinmann
 Oleta Adams' photo – Jeff Katz
 Design – Stylorouge

Charts

Weekly charts

Year-end charts

Certifications

References

1989 albums
Fontana Records albums
Neo-psychedelia albums
Progressive pop albums
Tears for Fears albums